The Association for Business Psychology is the professional representative, deliberative and regulatory institution for business psychologists in the United Kingdom and Ireland.  It holds regular conferences, approves university courses in the field, negotiates on behalf of the profession, and makes training and other information available both to members and to others.

History

The Association was set up in 2000 by members of the Division of Occupational Psychology of the British Psychological Society who felt that the Society was too academic in its approach and insufficiently attuned to the practical and fast-moving needs of their organisational clients.  The first chair was Dr Brian Baxter. 
The Association was renamed the Association for Business Psychology following a membership vote in December 2013.  The current chair is Ben Williams.  The Association's purpose is to "champion business psychology."

Definition

Business Psychology is the study and practice of improving working life. It combines an understanding of the science of human behaviour with experience of the world of work to attain effective and sustainable performance for both individuals and organisations.

Business Psychology in Practice

Examples of how business psychology is applied can be found in a collection of case studies, published by Wiley .  
A second book, Business Psychology in Action, was released in Paperback on 2 Dec. 2015. 

Further examples are published regularly on the ABP website at http://www.theabp.org.uk/news.aspx. Many additional case studies have been collected by the ABP from submissions to their annual Workforce Experience Awards programme, which are released from time to time.

References

External links
ABP website

Psychology organisations based in the United Kingdom